José Orlando "Chepe" Martínez Peña (born September 30, 1979 in  El Salvador) is a retired Salvadoran football player, who most prominently played as a forward for Luis Ángel Firpo.

Club career
Nicknamed Chepe, Martínez came through the Instituto Nacional de Apopa to earn himself a contract with Atlético Marte in 2000. He then had a short spell at San Salvador F.C. before joining Luis Ángel Firpo with whom he spent a couple of years. In 2007, he moved to Alianza, only for him to return to Marte two years later.

In 2010, he apparently finished his career to take up cycling, but in 2011 he took up coaching youth players.

International career
Martínez made his debut for El Salvador in a March 2004 friendly match against Guatemala and has earned a total of 27 caps, scoring 2 goals. He has represented his country in 7 FIFA World Cup qualification matches and played at the 2007 UNCAF Nations Cup as well as at the 2007 CONCACAF Gold Cup.

His final international game was a July 2008 friendly match against Guatemala.

International goals
Scores and results list El Salvador's goal tally first.

References

External links

1979 births
Living people
Sportspeople from San Salvador
Association football forwards
Salvadoran footballers
El Salvador international footballers
2005 UNCAF Nations Cup players
2007 UNCAF Nations Cup players
2007 CONCACAF Gold Cup players
C.D. Atlético Marte footballers
San Salvador F.C. footballers
C.D. Luis Ángel Firpo footballers
Alianza F.C. footballers